Elena Horvat (Hungarian: Ilona Horváth, later Florea, born 4 July 1958) is a retired Romanian rower. She is a world champion and Olympic gold medallist in the coxless pair.

Horvat was born in Luizi-Călugăra in Bacău County in 1958. She moved to Bucharest at a young age but two sisters still live in her home village. Initially a member of Viitorul București, she later joined CSA Steaua București. She went to the 1980 Summer Olympics in Moscow as a reserve rower but did not get to compete.

Horvat competed at the 1984 Olympics and won a gold medal in the coxless pair. At world championships, she won one gold, one silver and two bronze medals between 1981 and 1985.

References

External links
 
 
 
 
 
 

1958 births
Living people
Romanian female rowers
Rowers at the 1984 Summer Olympics
Olympic gold medalists for Romania
Olympic rowers of Romania
Olympic medalists in rowing
Medalists at the 1984 Summer Olympics
World Rowing Championships medalists for Romania
People from Bacău County